Maria. Save Moscow is a 2021 Russian war / drama film directed by Vera Storozheva. It premiered at the Stalker Film Festival on December 12, 2021, and was theatrically released on January 27, 2022.

Plot 
The plot takes place during the Great Patriotic War and focuses on the battle for Moscow.

The plot of the film is based on the legend of the miraculous icon, which during the Great Patriotic War should be delivered to Moscow by junior lieutenant Maria Petrova, who was the daughter of a priest, but renounced him and the faith.

Cast 
 Mariya Lugovaya as Maria Petrova (also tr. Mariya Petrova)
 Artur Smolyaninov
 Ilya Malakov as Sergeant
 Sergei Puskepalis as Commissioner
 Dmitry Mazurov as Pavel Minaev
 Tatyana Yakhina as Lyuba Minaeva

Production
Filming ended in February 2021, with shooting taking place in Moscow and Rostov Veliky.

Release
Maria. Save Moscow premiered at the Stalker Human Rights Film Festival on December 12, 2021 and was theatrically released in Russia on January 27, 2022.

References

External links 
 

2021 films
2020s Russian-language films
2021 war drama films
Russian war drama films
Russian historical drama films
Russian World War II films
Films set in the Soviet Union
Eastern Front of World War II films
World War II films based on actual events